The meridian 179° east of Greenwich is a line of longitude that extends from the North Pole across the Arctic Ocean, Asia, the Pacific Ocean, the Southern Ocean, and Antarctica to the South Pole.

The 179th meridian east forms a great circle with the 1st meridian west.

From Pole to Pole
Starting at the North Pole and heading south to the South Pole, the 179th meridian east passes through:

{| class="wikitable plainrowheaders"
! scope="col" width="130" | Co-ordinates
! scope="col" | Country, territory or sea
! scope="col" | Notes
|-
| style="background:#b0e0e6;" | 
! scope="row" style="background:#b0e0e6;" | Arctic Ocean
| style="background:#b0e0e6;" |
|-
| 
! scope="row" | 
| Chukotka Autonomous Okrug — Wrangel Island
|-
| style="background:#b0e0e6;" | 
! scope="row" style="background:#b0e0e6;" | Chukchi Sea
| style="background:#b0e0e6;" |
|-
| 
! scope="row" | 
| Chukotka Autonomous Okrug
|-
| style="background:#b0e0e6;" | 
! scope="row" style="background:#b0e0e6;" | Bering Sea
| style="background:#b0e0e6;" | Gulf of Anadyr
|-
| 
! scope="row" | 
| Chukotka Autonomous Okrug
|-
| style="background:#b0e0e6;" | 
! scope="row" style="background:#b0e0e6;" | Bering Sea
| style="background:#b0e0e6;" |
|-
| 
! scope="row" | 
| Alaska — island of Amchitka
|-valign="top"
| style="background:#b0e0e6;" | 
! scope="row" style="background:#b0e0e6;" | Pacific Ocean
| style="background:#b0e0e6;" | Passing just east of the island of Vaitupu,  (at ) Passing just west of Funafuti atoll,  (at )
|-
| 
! scope="row" | 
| Island of Vanua Levu
|-
| style="background:#b0e0e6;" | 
! scope="row" style="background:#b0e0e6;" | Koro Sea
| style="background:#b0e0e6;" | Passing just east of the island of Makogai,  (at )
|-
| 
! scope="row" | 
| Wakaya Island
|-valign="top"
| style="background:#b0e0e6;" | 
! scope="row" style="background:#b0e0e6;" | Pacific Ocean
| style="background:#b0e0e6;" | Passing just west of the Bounty Islands,  (at ) Passing just east of the Antipodes Islands,  (at )
|-
| style="background:#b0e0e6;" | 
! scope="row" style="background:#b0e0e6;" | Southern Ocean
| style="background:#b0e0e6;" |
|-
| 
! scope="row" | Antarctica
| Ross Dependency — claimed by 
|-
|}

See also
178th meridian east
180th meridian

e179 meridian east